Godding is a surname. Notable people with the surname include:

Brian Godding (born 1945), Welsh musician
Keith Godding (born 1984), Canadian football player